Little Orphan Airedale is a Warner Bros. Looney Tunes cartoon directed by Charles M. Jones and released on October 4, 1947. Its major significance is its status as the official debut of Jones' version of Robert "Bob" Clampett's character, Charlie "Rover" the Dog. The title is a play on Little Orphan Annie.

Plot
The cartoon's story (which is essentially a re-working of Bob Clampett's 1941 short Porky's Pooch) is about a dog named Rags McMutt, who has just escaped from the dog pound and accidentally meets Charlie, an old friend of his, in a car that he used as a hiding place. Charlie tells Rags about the troubles he had. When Rags sees how Charlie begs Porky to keep him as a pet, he decides to go back to the pound (even though he has a hard time getting back in).

References

External links
 

1947 animated films
1947 short films
1947 films
1940s Warner Bros. animated short films
1940s English-language films
Looney Tunes shorts
Warner Bros. Cartoons animated short films
Short films directed by Chuck Jones
Animated films about dogs
Porky Pig films
Short film remakes
Films scored by Carl Stalling
Films with screenplays by Michael Maltese
Charlie Dog films